Walter Granville-Smith was an illustrator and painter who was born in South Granville, New York on January 28, 1870. He is notable for producing the first colored illustration that appeared in the United States. Granville-Smith and his wife, Jessie, had a daughter Jesse and sons, Walter. and Edward. Granville-Smith died on December 7, 1938, at his daughter's home in Jackson Heights, Queens, New York.

Granville-Smith was a National Academician in 1915 with the National Academy of Design and served as president of the Salmagundi Club in New York from 1924 to 1926. His works are part of the permanent collections of the Smithsonian Institution (Grey Day), Butler Institute of American Art (The Willow), Toledo Museum of Art (South Haven Mill), the Currier Museum of Art (Truth), the Salmagundi Club, the Lotos Club, the Fencers Club of New York and the Art Club of Philadelphia. Many of his works can be seen at the Athenaeum website.

Career
Granville-Smith attended the Newark Academy in Newark, New Jersey. He received his first instruction in painting from David McClure and as a teenager he studied under Walter Satterlee. He then studied at the Art Students League of New York under Willard Metcalf and James Carroll Beckwith.

Granville-Smith started his career as a magazine illustrator. His illustrations appeared in Harper’s Magazine, Century Illustrated Monthly Magazine, Metropolitan Magazine, and Collier's. He was noted for his pioneering work in color. As an illustrator, he produced the first colored illustration to appear in the United States, for Gertrude Atherton’s A Christmas Witch, in the January 1893 issue of Godey’s Lady’s Book

In 1897 Granville-Smith toured Europe, visiting Holland, Belgium, and France. In Paris he studied at the Academie Julien. After 1900 Granville-Smith focused on landscape painting. He acquired a summer home in Bellport, New York in 1908, and this area became a frequent subject of his landscape and seascape paintings. His New York Studio was located at 96 Fifth Avenue. His work was part of the painting event in the art competition at the 1928 Summer Olympics.

Awards

Granville-Smith won numerous art awards, including
Third Hallgarten prize, National Academy of Design, 1900
Bronze medal, Charleston Expo., 1902
Evans prize, American Watercolor Society, 1905
First prize, Worcester Art Museum, 1906
Hon. Mention, Carnegie Institute, Pittsburgh, 1907
Inness gold medal, National Academy of Design, 1908
Bronze medal, Buenos Aires Expo, 1910
Vezin Prize, Salmagundi Club, 1911
Shaw purchase prize, Salmagundi Club, 1913
Hudnut prize, American Watercolor Society, 1916
Isidor prize, Salmagundi Club, 1918
Turnbull prize, 1922
Auction Exhibition prize, 1925
Carnegie prize, National Academy of Design, 1927
Purchase prize, Salmagundi Club, 1928
Second Altman prize, National Academy of Design, 1929
First Altman prize, National Academy of Design, 1933

Gallery

References

1870 births
1938 deaths
American illustrators
19th-century American painters
20th-century American painters
American male painters
Artists from Newark, New Jersey
Newark Academy alumni
People from Granville, New York
Painters from New Jersey
Painters from New York City
Art Students League of New York alumni
Olympic competitors in art competitions
19th-century American male artists
20th-century American male artists